Shooglenifty are a Scottish, Edinburgh-based six-piece Celtic fusion band that tours internationally. The band blends Scottish traditional music with influences ranging from electronica to alternative rock. They contributed to Afro Celt Sound System's 1996 album Volume 1: Sound Magic.
The band have performed in countries including Australia, Austria, Cuba, Belgium, France, Norway, Ireland, Italy, Denmark, New Zealand, Indonesia, South Africa, Lebanon, Spain, the US, Canada, Malaysia, Singapore, Japan, India, Germany, Sweden, the Netherlands, Russia, Luxembourg, Hungary, the Czech Republic, Slovakia, Slovenia, Poland, Switzerland, Portugal, Mexico and the UK. They have performed for a number of notable fans, including Prince Charles, Tony Blair, Nelson Mandela, and Emperor Akihito of Japan.

Several of the band members had previously played together in Swamptrash.

Angus R. Grant, the band's fiddler and frontman, died in October 2016 at the age 49. Eilidh Shaw joined the band on fiddle after Grant's death.

Albums
 Venus in Tweeds (Greentrax) – 1994
 A Whisky Kiss (Greentrax) – 1996
 Live at Selwyn Hall (Womad) – 1996
 Solar Shears (Compass/Verical) – 2001
 The Arms Dealer's Daughter (Compass) – 2003
 Radical Mestizo (Compass) – 2005
 Troots (Shoogle) – 2007
 Murmichan (Shoogle) – 2009
 The Untied Knot (Shoogle) – 2015
 Written in Water with Dhun Dhora (Shoogle) – 2018 
 Acid Croft Vol 9  (Shoogle) – 2020

Current members
 Eilidh Shaw – fiddle
 Garry Finlayson – banjo and banjax
 James Mackintosh – drums, drum machines and darabuka
 Ewan MacPherson – mandolin and tenor banjo
 Quee MacArthur – bass and percussion
 Malcolm Crosbie – acoustic and electric guitars
 Kaela Rowan – vocals

Former members
 Angus R. Grant – fiddle
 Iain McLeod – mandolin
 Conrad Ivitsky – bass
 Luke Plumb – mandolin

References

External links
 
Shooglenifty at Foot Stompin’ Free Scottish Music Podcast

Musical groups from Edinburgh
Celtic fusion groups
Real World Records artists
Vertical Records artists
Compass Records artists